The qualification for the 2012 AFC U-16 Championship.

Format
Forty teams have entered the fray for this edition of the tournament and have been divided into two zones – West (22) and East (18). The teams will be divided into seven groups of six and five teams each.

West Zone will have two groups of six and two of five teams while East will have three groups of six teams each.

Top two teams from each of the groups and best third team from West and East zones will qualify for the tournament.

Seedings 
The draw for the 2012 AFC U-16 Championship qualification took place at AFC House on 30 March 2011.

 were drawn into Group A but withdrew 

 were drawn into Group D but withdrew

 were drawn into Group E but withdrew

Groups

Group A 
All matches were held in Duhok, Iraq (UTC+3).

Group B 
All matches were held in Kuwait City and Hawally, Kuwait (UTC+3).

Group C 
All matches were held in Tashkent, Uzbekistan (UTC+5).

Group D 
All matches were held in Kathmandu, Nepal (UTC+5:45).

Group E 
All matches were held in Pyongyang, North Korea (UTC+9).

Group F 
All matches were held in Vientiane, Laos (UTC+7).

Group G 
All matches were held in Nonthaburi (Nonthaburi) and Bangkok, Thailand (UTC+7).

Third-placed qualifiers 
At the end of the first stage, a comparison was made between the third placed teams from West and East zones will qualify for the tournament. The best third-placed team from each region advanced to the 2012 AFC U-16 Championship. Due to the varying number of teams per group, teams in different group would have played different number of matches. Therefore, in order to ensure equality when comparing the runner-up teams of all the groups, all teams will be compared across similar number of matches. AFC will decide on the number of matches. In principle, the results of the matches between the runner-up team and the bottom placed team in the group will be considered null and void.

West Zone
In western Zone Saudi Arabia qualified as best third-place finisher.

East Zone
In the Eastern zone Laos qualified as best third-place finisher.

Qualifiers

See also
 2012 AFC U-19 Championship qualification

References

Qual
AFC U-16 Championship qualification
Qual